See Siang Wong (Chinese: 黃旭洋 pinyin: huáng xù yáng, born May 7, 1979 in Arnhem, Netherlands) is a Swiss-Malaysian pianist.

Wong's parents, both Chinese, were born in Singapore and Malaysia.  Wong studied in the Netherlands with Marjès Benoist and in Switzerland with the pianists Homero Francesch and Bruno Canino.  He made his debut at age 12, accompanied by the Dutch Radio Orchestra.

In addition to his performances of standard repertoire, Wong has an interest in contemporary music.  In 2008, he initiated the Project "Swiss Piano", in which he is promoting the creation of new piano works. Many Swiss composers have contributed to this project already and dedicated piano pieces to him, including Daniel Fueter, Hans Ulrich Lehmann, Laurent Mettraux, Jürg Wyttenbach, Gérard Zinsstag, and Alfred Zimmerlin.

On the Decca Label (Universal Music Group) Wong has released six albums:
 Chopin: Waltzes and Nocturnes
 Claude Debussy: Early piano works
 Mozart: Piano Sonatas
 Schumann: Piano Works
 Beethoven: Piano Sonatas
 Haydn/Mozart: Piano Concertos).
In 2012, he released his first album on the RCA Red Seal Label (Sony Classical) with piano works of Franz Schubert, which won the Golden Label Award of the Belgian classical critics.  His Novalis recordings of concertos by Chopin, Mozart, Schumann and Beethoven  were honoured by Swiss Radio with a "Classic Highlight" Award.  Wong has also recorded for deutsche harmonia mundi.

Since 2002, Wong has served on the faculty of the Zurich University of the Arts, the youngest faculty member to be appointed to the institute at the time.  Outside of music, Wong is a noted cook and food blogger.  In 2018 he was the winner of the Swiss TV cooking show Männerküche.  He resides in Zurich.

Recordings

References

External links

Food blog of See Siang Wong
Swiss Piano
 Steinway artist page on See Siang Wong

1979 births
Living people
Chinese classical pianists
Dutch classical pianists
Swiss classical pianists
People from Arnhem
Musicians from Gelderland
Academic staff of the Zurich University of the Arts
21st-century classical pianists